Clacton is a large town in Essex, England.

Clacton may also refer to the following things associated with it:

Clacton (UK Parliament constituency)  a county constituency represented in the House of Commons around Clacton-on-Sea
Clacton-on-Sea railway station a railway station in Clacton-on-Sea
Clacton Airport an airport serving Clacton-on-Sea
Clacton Pier a pier in Clacton-on-Sea
Clacton Coastal Academy a coeducational high school serving the western part of Clacton-on-Sea
Clacton County High School a comprehensive secondary school located in Clacton-on-Sea
F.C. Clacton a football club based in Clacton-on-Sea
Great Clacton a village north of Clacton-on-Sea
HMS Clacton (J151) an old turbine engined Bangor class minesweeper named after Clacton-on-Sea
Little Clacton a small rural village close to Clacton-on-Sea
Clactonian, a flint tool
Butlin's Clacton, a former holiday camp
Clacton Spear, the oldest known worked wooden implement